John Lucas, 1st Baron Lucas of Shenfield (23 October 1606 – 2 July 1671) was an English Royalist soldier, industrialist and landowner.

Lucas was the son of Sir Thomas Lucas and Elizabeth Leighton. He was one of eight children which included other notable people such as Sir Thomas Lucas, Sir Charles Lucas (d.1648), both Royalist officers, and the philosopher Margaret Cavendish.

Lucas was an early public supporter of the Royalist cause and in 1638 he was appointed to the household of the eight year old Prince of Wales. His house in Colchester, St John's, was attacked by a crowd during the Stour Valley Riots of 1642 and he was imprisoned by Parliamentarian forces early in the First English Civil War, but escaped and fought for the king at the Battle of Naseby. On 3 January 1645 he was created Baron Lucas of Shenfield, of Shenfield in the Peerage of England. He was again imprisoned by Parliament in 1655, before being released prior to the Stuart Restoration in 1660. He was elected an Original Fellow of the Royal Society in 1663; he was possibly expelled in 1666.

He married Anne Nevill in 1628. Lucas had one surviving daughter, Mary Grey, Countess of Kent, who was created suo jure Baroness Lucas of Crudwell at her father's request. Lucas was buried at St Giles's church, Colchester. He died without surviving male issue and by a special remainder in his patent, the heir to his title was Charles Lucas, 2nd Baron Lucas (1631–1688), son of his elder brother Sir Thomas Lucas.

References

Sources
 
 
 The Peerage: John Lucas, 1st Baron Lucas of Shenfield

1606 births
1671 deaths
Cavaliers
Royalist military personnel of the English Civil War
English industrialists
Lucas, John

John
Barons Lucas